The 1922 Denver Pioneers football team was an American football team that represented the University of Denver as a member of the Rocky Mountain Conference (RMC) during the 1922 college football season. In their third and final season under head coach Fred J. Murphy, the Pioneers compiled a 6–1–1 record (3–1–1 against conference opponents), finished third in the RMC, and outscored opponents by a total of 107 to 48.

Schedule

References

Denver
Denver Pioneers football seasons
Denver Pioneers football